The 1994 IPB Czech Indoor was a men's tennis tournament played on indoor carpet courts at the ČEZ Aréna in Ostrava in the Czech Republic and was part of the World Series of the 1994 ATP Tour. It was the inaugural edition of the tournament and took place from 10 October until 16 October 1994. Fifth-seeded MaliVai Washington won the singles title.

Finals

Singles

 MaliVai Washington defeated  Arnaud Boetsch 3–6, 6–4, 6–3
 It was Washington's 1st singles title of the year and the 3rd of his career.

Doubles

 Martin Damm /  Karel Nováček defeated  Gary Muller /  Piet Norval 6–4, 1–6, 6–3

References

External links
 ITF tournament edition details

IPB Czech Indoor
Ostrava Open
1994 in Czech tennis